Maghi Purnima, also known by the name of Magha Purnima, is known to be a day of the full moon that occurs during the Hindu calendar month of Magh. This day falls during the Gregorian calendar month of January or February. During this time period, the auspicious Kumbh Mela is held every twelve years, and the Magha Mela is held on an annual basis at the confluence of three rivers or Triveni Sangam all around north India, such as in cities like Allahabad or Prayag.

Date in Gregorian calendar
2027 || 9 February

See also
Basant Panchmi

References

Observances held on the full moon
Hindu festivals
Festivals in India
Kumbh Mela